Szentpéterfa is a village in Vas County, Hungary.

Famous people 
 Stefan Geosits (* 1927), writer and translator of the Burgenland Croats

References

Populated places in Vas County